RTK could refer to:

 Radio Television of Kosovo, public service broadcaster in Kosovo
 Real-time kinematic, a technique for precision satellite navigation
 Receptor tyrosine kinase, high-affinity cell surface receptors
 Right-To-Know
 RTK1, RTK2, RTK3, Remembering the Kanji, books teaching Japanese Kanji
 Rentech, Inc., NYSE symbol